The U.S. state of Oregon has six state forests. Five are administered by the Oregon Department of Forestry, while Elliot State Forest is administered by the Oregon Department of State Lands.

Former state forests
Former state forests include:

Adair Tract State Forest aka Paul M. Dunn Research Forest, renamed and jointly administered as the McDonald-Dunn Forest by Oregon State University
George T. Gerlinger State Experimental Forest, administered by the Oregon Department of Forestry as part of its West Oregon District 
McDonald State Forest, north of Corvallis
Van Duzer State Forest, now part of the H. B. Van Duzer Forest State Scenic Corridor

See also
 Lists of Oregon-related topics
 Black Rock, Oregon

References

Oregon
State forests